= Lin Po-cheng =

Taiwanese footballer

Personal information
- Full name: Lin Po-cheng
- Date of birth: October 18, 1985 (age 41)
- Position: Goalkeeper

Senior career*
Years	Team	Apps	(Gls)
- Taiwan PE College

International career
2010–	Chinese Taipei	10	(0)
- * Club domestic league appearances and goals

Lin Po-cheng (林柏辰, born 18 October 1985) is a Taiwanese professional footballer. He made his first appearance for the Chinese Taipei national football team in 2010.
